Fissurina atlantica is a species of corticolous (bark-dwelling) script lichen in the family Graphidaceae. Found in Brazil, it was formally described as a new species in 2018 by Thamires Almeida Pereira, Marcela Eugenia da Silva Cáceres, and Robert Lücking. It is the first species in genus Fissurina to form soralia. The species epithet atlantica refers to its habitat.

References

Graphidaceae
Lichen species
Lichens described in 2018
Lichens of Northeast Brazil
Taxa named by Robert Lücking
Taxa named by Marcela Cáceres